Cowal RFC is a rugby union side based in Dunoon, Argyll and Bute, Scotland. The club was founded in 1976. They play their home games at Dunoon Stadium.

History

The club runs a men's XV, a women's XV and junior sections.

It runs a rugby festival to introduce the local primary schools to rugby.

The Cowal Junior side played its first competitive match at Scotstoun Stadium on 8 March 2019. They played against Moffat RFC in a half time match during the Women's Six Nations Championship Scotland v Wales match.

The local Rugby Development Officer works with the four main schools in Cowal RFC's catchment area and this has helped boost the junior numbers coming to the club.

Famous players to play for or against Cowal.

Jordan Muncie

References 

Rugby union in Argyll and Bute
Scottish rugby union teams
Rugby clubs established in 1976